Made in Bangladesh (also known in Bengali as Shimu ;) is a 2019 Bangladeshi drama film directed by Rubaiyat Hossain. It premiered in the Contemporary World Cinema section at the 2019 Toronto International Film Festival, following the participation at BFI London Film Festival, Locarno Film Festival and other major festivals. Distributed by Pyramide Films, the film was widely released in France on 4 December 2019 and running for several months following the theatrical release worldwide including USA, Canada, Denmark, Portugal, Germany, China, Mexico, Singapore, Australia, Turkey, Bangladesh and Japan.

Plot
Shimu, 23, works in a clothing factory in Dhaka, Bangladesh. Faced with difficult conditions at work, she decides to start a union with her co-workers. Despite threats from the management and disapproval of her husband, Shimu is determined to go on. Together the women must fight and find a way.

Cast

 Rikita Nandini Shimu as Shimu
 Novera Rahman as Daliya
 Deepanwita Martin as Reshma
 Parvin Paru as Maya
 Mayabi Rahman as Tania
 Shatabdi Wadud as Reza
 Mostafa Monwar as Sohel
 Mita Rahman as Moyna's mother 
 Shahana Goswami as Nasima

Critical response
Had its world premiere at Toronto International Film Festival (TIFF), the artistic director of TIFF Cameron Bailey mentioned the main character of the film as "She is the Norma Rae we need now". Writing for Cinema Scope, Dana Reinoos described the film as "a vision of feminist solidarity in the face of overwhelming opposition" while Jordan Mintzer of The Hollywood Reporter called it "an earnest if sometimes schematic portrait of social rebellion' and wrote that it "definitely deserves wider attention."

The film won the Premio Interfedi Award at the Torino Film Festival, the Audience Award at the African Diaspora Film Festival, and the Norwegian Peace Film Award at the Tromsø International Film Festival.

References

External links
 

2019 films
2019 drama films
2010s Bengali-language films
Bengali-language Bangladeshi films
Bangladeshi drama films